Berlin Defence or Berlin Variation may refer to variations in two chess openings:
 Berlin Defence of the Bishop's Opening
 Berlin Defence (chess), in the Ruy Lopez